Gare de Lyon is a station on Line 1 and Line 14 of the Paris Métro. It is connected to the Gare de Lyon mainline rail and RER platforms within one complex and is the third-busiest station on the network with 30.91 million entering passengers in 2004, made up of 15.78 million on Line 1 and 15.13 million on Line 14.

Line 1
The line 1 station was one of the eight original stations opened as part of the first section of line 1 between Porte de Vincennes and Porte Maillot on 19 July 1900. It was built with a length of 100 metres instead of the 75-metre length used for the stations of the line before their extension during the rebuilding of the line for rubber-tyre operation. The station was built cut and cover and is covered by a 23.90-metre-wide metal deck, which supports the streets above. It originally had four lines flanking two 6-metre-wide platforms in order to accommodate the proposed circular line (then called Line 2), although this was never completed. From 1 August 1906 the northern terminus of Line 5 was temporarily located at the spare platforms, requiring a reversal at Quai de la Rapée. On 17 December 1906 Line 5 was extended to Jacques Bonsergent and the section between Quai de la Rapée and Gare de Lyon was closed. The route of the closed line and the spare platforms at Gare de Lyon were used as part of a 60 cm (24 in) gauge railway, known as the Voie des Finances, operated by the Ministry of Finance to move currency from 1937 to 1957.

The Line 1 platforms were raised during the weekend of 18 and 19 July 2009 as part of the line's automation.

Line 14

The station of Line 14 was opened on 15 October 1998. It is located south of the Gare de Lyon in the Rue de Bercy, next to the stations of RER lines A and D. It has two lines on either side of a large central platform. Between the eastbound lane from Olympiades and the RATP headquarters is an exotic garden.

The STIF board of directors decided on 27 May 2009 to provide funding in 2010 for a third access in the middle of the platform to facilitate movement within the busy and relatively narrow station. This new access will join the existing bridge over the tracks, which currently provides access to the RER, but is not used to access Line 14. This would separate the flow of arriving and departing passengers.

Station layout

Gallery

References

Accessible Paris Métro stations
Paris Métro stations in the 12th arrondissement of Paris
Railway stations in France opened in 1900